Square Enix Limited (formerly Domark Limited and Eidos Interactive Limited) is a British subsidiary of Japanese video game company Square Enix, acting as their European publishing arm. The company formerly owned Tomb Raider, which it purchased with CentreGold in 1996, and Crystal Dynamics, which it acquired in 1998, among numerous other assets. Other published games series include Championship Manager debuted in 1992 and Hitman from 2000 to 2017. Square Enix Limited and fellow group company Square Enix Incorporated shared Phil Rogers as CEO and other executives from 2013 to 2022.

The company was founded as Domark in 1984 by Mark Strachan and Dominic Wheatley. In 1995, it was acquired by Eidos plc and merged with Simis and Big Red Software to create subsidiary Eidos Interactive the following year. Ian Livingstone, who held a stake in Domark, became executive chairman of Eidos in 1995 and later assumed various roles. In 2005, Eidos plc was in turn acquired by British games publisher SCi. The combined company, SCi Entertainment Group, which was briefly renamed Eidos, was bought by Square Enix in 2009. In late 2009, Square Enix completed the merger of its existing European branch with Eidos Interactive, trading the resulting company as Square Enix Limited, which assumed the trade name Square Enix Europe. In August 2022, Swedish games holding company Embracer Group completed its acquisition of studios Crystal Dynamics, Eidos-Montréal and Square Enix Montréal and intellectual properties Tomb Raider, Deus Ex among other assets, with Rogers and management moving to Embracer.

Square Enix Limited contains Square Enix's Western third party publishing division, Square Enix External Studios, and indie initiative division, Square Enix Collective. It is headquartered in Southwark, London (Square Enix London) and has offices in Paris, France (Square Enix France) and Hamburg, Germany (Square Enix Germany).

History

Foundation as Domark (1984–1994) 

Square Enix Limited was founded as Domark by Mark Strachan and Dominic Wheatley in 1984. For Christmas 1983, Wheatley (the grandson of the writer Dennis Wheatley) had visited his family, where he saw his brother play The Heroes of Karn on a newly purchased Commodore 64. He was impressed with the game and felt that many more ordinary people, not just those who work with computers professionally, would start acquiring computers and games for them. When he returned to his job as a junior account executive at Garden—a small advertising agency based in London—in early 1984, he spoke to his colleague Strachan and floated the idea of setting up a company to publish games from third-party developers. Strachan initially declined but later saw that many retailers in the city had sold out of ZX Spectrum models, which he felt signalled great interest in video games. Strachan and Wheatley, at the time aged 24, subsequently quit their jobs and founded Domark, forming a portmanteau of their first names for the company name. For their first game, they designed the adventure game Eureka!, hired the Hungarian developer Andromedia, and brought in Ian Livingstone as its writer. Strachan and Wheatley further devised a competition in which a telephone number would be shown upon completing the game, and the first person to call it would win . Through friends, family, and other acquaintances, they raised , more than enough to finance the project. Domark released the game later in 1984, marketing it through Concept Marketing, another firm set up by Strachan and Wheatley. Impressed with the company's operations, Livingstone invested  in Domark. Eureka! sold 15,000 copies. Domark were unsure what project to pursue next; Strachan and Wheatley had a contact in the estate of Ian Fleming and approached them with the idea of producing a video game based on James Bond. In 1985, Domark obtained a licence to A View to a Kill. Despite delays caused by scope creep, the eponymous game was released later in 1985 and was "actually quite successful", according to Wheatley.

Domark found further success with computer conversions of board games: Trivial Pursuit was becoming increasingly popular, so Domark got into contact with Leisure Genius, which had found success with board game conversions. The team at Leisure Genius believed a conversion of Trivial Pursuit was infeasible and thus gave way to Domark, who hired Oxford Digital Enterprises to develop it. Released in 1986, the Trivial Pursuit sold roughly 2 million copies. The success allowed Domark to move into proper offices and hire more employees. Domark released further Trivial Pursuit and James Bond games in the years following. The company also got into arcade game conversions in 1987 when Wheatley, alone at the Consumer Electronics Show in Las Vegas, encountered Manlio Allegra, an agent for companies including Atari Games. Allegra wanted Domark to produce conversions for as many games as possible but Wheatley claimed that the company had only  to spend. Allegra then went through a list of games to be licensed at low prices and Wheatley stopped him when he mentioned the Star Wars trilogy of games. They agreed on a license for Wheatley's claimed budget. To have the games developed, Domark brought in a German programmer who had previously brought them to the Amiga. Impressed with this return, Atari Games hired Domark as the exclusive partner for computer conversions of arcade games. With sufficient funds, the company published various games through the rest of the 1980s. It set up an internal development team, The Kremlin, within its Putney headquarters in 1990 and expanded to 20 employees by 1992. In the same year, Livingstone joined Domark's board as an investor, while Wheatley moved with his wife and two children to the US to better manage the company's American contacts. A US subsidiary for Domark was formally established in Silicon Valley in 1993.

Transformation into Eidos Interactive (1994–2005) 

Domark was struggling financially by 1994 and Strachan and Wheatley encountered Charles Cornwall, Chairman of Eidos, a company that developed video compression software for platforms like the Acorn Archimedes. Eidos had no sales at that time, so the two companies agreed to a reverse merger takeover: The companies merged, and Domark was legally renamed Eidos, with Domark's operations aligned as a subsidiary of the newer Eidos. The new company was floated on the stock market as Eidos that year. Livingstone became executive chairman and Strachan left Domark in that year.

On 31 May 1996, Simis and Big Red Software were merged into Domark group to create Eidos Interactive. CentreGold consisted of distributor CentreSoft and publisher U.S. Gold, which included subsidiaries Core Design and Silicon Dreams Studio. The acquisition was months prior to the release of Tomb Raider by Core Design, which CentreGold had itself acquired two years prior. Silicon Dreams Studio was re-acquired by its founder, Geoff Brown, through newly founded Geoff Brown Holdings (later Kaboom Studios), on 16 December that year. After Tomb Raider, in 1997, Wheatley left the company to move back to the UK and focus on other projects. In November 2000, Eidos CEO Cornwall left the company and was succeeded by former COO Michael McGarvey. In 2003, Eidos Interactive founded Beautiful Game Studios, which continued its Championship Manager series after splitting with previous developer Sports Interactive. In March 2004, Eidos Interactive acquired Danish developer IO Interactive.

On 21 March 2005, Eidos received a takeover bid from Elevation Partners, the private equity firm owned by former Electronic Arts president John Riccitiello and with a number of notable partners, including U2's lead singer Bono. Elevation stated it plans to take Eidos private for some years to focus on game creation and release schedules and its offer was initially recommended by Eidos's board.

Eidos plc acquisition by SCi (2005–2009) 

The following day, 22 March, Eidos plc received a second takeover bid from the British video game publisher SCi. The company offered , and tabled a restructuring plan to cut  from annual costs. To fund this takeover, SCi proposed to sell  worth of stock. Eventually, in late April, Elevation Partners formally withdrew its offer, leaving the way clear for SCi. The Eidos plc takeover was finalized on 16 May 2005, with SCi merging itself into Eidos Interactive's parent, renaming it SCi Entertainment Group Limited. Livingstone was the only retained board member and became Product Acquisition Director. SCi left its Battersea office and moved into former Eidos Interactive office on the second floor of Wimbledon Bridge House.

Ars Technica interviewed former Core Design Studio Manager Gavin Rummery in 2015, who said the studio pitched a Tomb Raider remake for the game's 10th anniversary to SCi in 2005. Rummery stated that SCi loved the project, but Crystal Dynamics had their own demo, which then convinced SCi to cancel Core's project. In May 2006, Rebellion Developments acquired Core Designs' assets and staff, while the Core brand and intellectual property, including Tomb Raider, remained in SCi's possession. In December 2006, Warner Bros. licensed classic properties to SCi, while investing for 10.3% of SCi shares. In February 2007, SCi/Eidos announced a new studio in Montreal, Quebec, which was later named Eidos-Montréal and developed a new game in the Deus Ex franchise. In February 2007, it acquired Rockpool Games, along with its two sister companies Ironstone Partners and SoGoPlay. In April 2007, SCi/Eidos acquired Bluefish Media and Morphene. In 2008, Rogers stated they want to be a "leaner and fitter company", as well as "studio-led". They moved "certain functions" from the United Kingdom to Quebec, Canada, partially due to economic advantages offered by Montreal's government.

On 4 September 2007, the board of SCi Entertainment stated that the company has been approached with a view to making an offer, which has been subject to speculation. On 10 January 2008, SCi announced take over and/or merger talks had been halted. As a result, the share price dropped by over 50%. Shareholders called for the resignation of key personnel, including chief executive officer (CEO) Jane Cavanagh, over this issue as well as delays to key titles. On 18 January 2008, Jane Cavanagh, Bill Ennis and Rob Murphy left the company. On 19 September 2008, SCi/Eidos opened a Shanghai-based studio, Eidos Shanghai, consisting of a small team to build up relations in Asia. In 2008, SCi/Eidos set up an entity, which later became Square Enix London Studios headed by Lee Singleton in their Wimbledon headquarters. In December 2008, SCi rebranded as Eidos plc. Eidos Hungary (formerly Mithis Entertainment), a developer acquired by the company developing the Battlestations series and Rockpool Games were closed in 2009, among other cuts.

SCi acquisition by Square Enix (2009–2022) 
The offer was backed by majority stakeholder Warner Bros. The date was brought forward, and Square Enix officially took over Eidos on 22 April 2009. Square Enix initially stated that it would let Eidos remain structured as it was at the time of its takeover. In July 2009, it announced that it would merge Eidos with its own pre-existing European subsidiary, Square Enix Limited (itself established in December 1998). The merger would create a new entity, tentatively titled Square Enix Europe. Eidos' US operations were merged with Square Enix Incorporated. The merger was completed on 9 November 2009 with the Square Enix Europe name being permanently retained as the resulting company name. The company continued to managed its own Western Studios and Eidos Montreal retained its name. Livingstone became Life President.

With the 2013 restructuring of Square Enix, it was hit by layoffs and Rogers became CEO of Americas and Europe. Livingstone departure from the company in September 2013. In 2014, Square Enix Collective launched, an indie developer service provider headed by Phil Elliot. Around 2015, Square Enix's Western divisions began "officially working across LA and London". In January 2017, Norwegian studio Artplant purchased former Eidos franchise Project I.G.I.. In November 2017, Square Enix stopped publishing the Hitman franchise and transferred the IP to game developer IO Interactive. In September 2018, COO Mike Sherlock died, with Square Enix's executive team assuming his immediate responsibilities. In 2018, Square Enix branded their third party publishing division Square Enix External Studios, which is headed by Jon Brooke and Lee Singleton. John Heinecke was appointed as CMO for Americas and Europe in October 2018. In June 2020, Square Enix donated $2.4 million to charities around their Western studios and offices, which were partially raised from sales of its discounted Square Enix Eidos Anthology bundle. A new mobile studio called Square Enix London Mobile, working on Tomb Raider Reloaded and an unannounced title based on Avatar: The Last Airbender with Navigator Games, was announced on 20 October 2021.

Studios and related assets acquired by Embracer (2022–present)
These included development studios Crystal Dynamics, Eidos-Montréal, Square Enix Montréal, and intellectual properties such as Tomb Raider, Deus Ex, Thief, Legacy of Kain alongside "more than 50 back-catalogue games", with the deal expected to be completed in the second quarter of Embracer's financial year. On 20 May 2022, Embracer Group stated that the announcement of this acquisition got an "overwhelming and positive response". The deal was completed on 26 August 2022. Embracer announced that the subsidiaries and IPs would form as their 12th operative group, under the leadership of Phil Rogers and his management, and was later given the name of CDE Entertainment. After the sale of those assets and studios, Square Enix Europe will continue with its own projects and publishing games from external studios including Outriders, Life Is Strange and Just Cause. In November 2022, Embracer Group shutdown Square Enix Montréal and transferred Eidos Shanghai to Gearbox Entertainment as Gearbox Studio Shanghai.

Divisions 
 Square Enix External Studios, formerly Square Enix London Studios, founded in 2008.
 Square Enix Collective, founded in 2014.

Former studios 
 Core Design in Derby, England; founded in 1988, CentreGold subsidiary, sold to Rebellion Developments in 2006.
 Silicon Dreams Studio in Adderbury, England; founded in 1994, CentreGold subsidiary, sold to its management in 1996.
 Crystal Dynamics in Redwood City, California, U.S.; founded in 1992, acquired in 1998, sold to Embracer Group in 2022.
 Toys for Bob in Novato, California, U.S.; founded in 1989, Crystal Dynamics subsidiary, sold to its management in 2002.
 Crystal Northwest in Seattle, Washington, U.S.; founded in 2018.
 Crystal Southwest in Austin, Texas, U.S.; founded in 2021.
 Ion Storm in Dallas, Texas, U.S.; founded in 1996, acquired in 1999, closed in 2005.
 Beautiful Game Studios in London, England; founded in 2003.
 IO Interactive in Copenhagen, Denmark; founded in 1998, acquired in 2004, sold to its management in 2017.
 Hapti.co in Copenhagen, Denmark; founded in 2012, sold off with IO Interactive in 2017.
 Pivotal Games in Bath, England; founded in 2000, SCi subsidiary, closed in 2008.
 Eidos Hungary in Budapest, Hungary; founded in 2002, acquired and renamed in 2006, closed in 2009.
 Eidos Studios Sweden in Helsingborg, Sweden; acquired in 2006.
 Eidos-Montréal in Montreal, Canada; founded in 2007, sold to Embracer Group in 2022.
 Eidos-Shanghai in Shanghai, China; founded in 2008 and part of Eidos-Montréal since 2019.
 Eidos-Sherbrooke in Sherbrooke, Canada; founded in 2020.
 Morpheme Wireless in London, England; founded in 1999, acquired in 2007.
 Gimme5Games in London, England; acquired in 2007, sold to its management in 2009.
 Rockpool Games in Manchester, England; founded in 2002, acquired in 2007, closed in 2009.
 Square Enix Montréal in Montreal, Canada; founded in 2011, sold to Embracer Group in 2022, later shut down.
 Square Enix London Mobile; founded in 2021

Games published

See also 

 Stephen B. Streater
 Kuju

Notes

References

Further reading

External links 
 
 Archive of Eidos Interactive's corporate website

Companies based in the London Borough of Southwark
Square Enix

British companies established in 1984
Video game companies of the United Kingdom
Video game companies established in 1984
1984 establishments in England
Video game development companies
2009 mergers and acquisitions
British subsidiaries of foreign companies